Jonathan Morris may refer to:

Jonathan D. Morris (1804–1875), American politician
Jonathan Morris (commentator) (born 1972), American media correspondent and former Roman Catholic priest
Jonathan Morris (author) (born 1973), English author, connected with the Doctor Who franchise
Jonathan S. Morris, American political scientist
Jonathan Morris, fictional character in Castlevania: Portrait of Ruin

See also
Jonathon Morris (born 1960), English actor, from the sitcom Bread
Jon Morris (born 1942), American football player
Jon Morris (ice hockey) (born 1966), American ice hockey player 
John Morris (disambiguation)
Johnny Morris (disambiguation)